Alexander Posch (21 June 1890 – 2 August 1950) was a German painter. His work was part of the painting event in the art competition at the 1936 Summer Olympics.

References

1890 births
1950 deaths
20th-century German painters
20th-century German male artists
German male painters
Olympic competitors in art competitions
People from Bergstraße (district)